Mustapha Zitouni (19 October 1928 – 5 January 2014) was a professional footballer who played as a defender. He played international football for both France and Algeria.

Career
Born in Algiers, French Algeria, Zitouni began his career with OM Saint-Eugène. He then played in France for Cannes, Monaco and Chartres. While in France he represented the French national side. He was also part of France's squad at the 1952 Summer Olympics, but he did not play in any matches. He left his professional career in France in 1958 to represent the unofficial Algerian national side, which was then run by the National Liberation Front, a rebel group campaigning for Algerian independence. While in Algeria he played football for RC Kouba.

Later life
Zitouni returned to France, settling in Côte d'Azur and working for Air Algerie in Nice.

He died on 5 January 2014, at the age of 85.

References

External links
 

1928 births
2014 deaths
Footballers from Algiers
Algerian footballers
Algeria international footballers
French footballers
France international footballers
Dual internationalists (football)
AS Cannes players
AS Monaco FC players
RC Kouba players
Ligue 1 players
Association football defenders
FLN football team players
Olympic footballers of France
Footballers at the 1952 Summer Olympics
21st-century Algerian people